Velma Jackson High School is a public high school in unincorporated Madison County, Mississippi, United States (with a Camden postal address). It is a part of the Madison County School District.

Notable alumni
Quinndary Weatherspoon, NBA player
Willie Young, Coach (1992-2002) and NFL player

References

External links
 Velma Jackson High School
 

Educational institutions established in 1960
Public high schools in Mississippi
Schools in Madison County, Mississippi
1960 establishments in Mississippi